Foreign relations between the Republic of Korea and Uruguay were established in 1964. South Korea has an embassy in Montevideo. Uruguay has an embassy in Seoul.

Both countries are members of the Group of 77.

South Korea is also an important trading partner for Uruguay.

See also
Foreign relations of South Korea
Foreign relations of Uruguay
Koreans in Uruguay

References

External links

 

 
Uruguay
Bilateral relations of Uruguay